The 2012 Tunbridge Wells Borough Council election was scheduled to take place on Thursday 3 May 2012 to elect members of Tunbridge Wells Borough Council in Kent, England. One third of the council was up for election.

Election result

Ward results

References

2012 English local elections
2012
2010s in Kent